Charles Ménétrier (born 1804 at Vimont (Calvados) - 19 May 1888) was a French theater critic as well as a playwright.

A journalist working for La Tribune, L'Entr'acte, Le Magasin pittoresque and the Revue et Gazette des Théâtres, and a friend of Camille Corot,  he wrote under the pen name Charles Listener. His plays were presented on the stage of the Gymnase-Enfantin.

Works 
1833 : Caliban, par deux ermites de Ménilmontant rentrés dans le monde, with Édouard Pouyat
1836 : Le cœur d'une mère, one-act comédie en vaudeville, with Xavier Veyrat
1837 : Le Nabab, ou la Sœur des anges, one-act comedy, mingled with songs
1840 : Arthur de Bretagne, épisode de l'histoire d'Angleterre (1202), in 1 act, mingled with songs
1841 : Un bal d'enfants, one-act comédie en vaudeville
1842 : Les Enfants d'Armagnac, épisode de l'histoire de Paris, 1418, in 1 act mingled with songs
1876 : Galerie historique de la Comédie Française pour servir de complément à la Troupe de Talma, with Edmond-Denis De Manne

Bibliography 
 Pierre Larousse, Grand dictionnaire universel du XIXe siècle (suppl.), vol.17, 1888
 Georges d'Heylli, Dictionnaire des pseudonymes, 1977, (p. 256)

References

External links 
 Charls Ménétrier on Data.bnf.fr

19th-century French dramatists and playwrights
French theatre critics
People from Calvados (department)
1804 births
1888 deaths